Per Alfred Mattson was a Swedish rower who competed in the 1912 Summer Olympics.

He was a member of the Swedish boat Roddklubben af 1912 which was eliminated in the quarterfinals of the men's eight tournament.

References

Year of birth missing
Year of death missing
Swedish male rowers
Olympic rowers of Sweden
Rowers at the 1912 Summer Olympics